Henry Sun is a Taiwanese biologist and a politician. He was the Deputy Minister of the National Science Council (now Ministry of Science and Technology) of the Executive Yuan from May 2012 until March 2014.

Early career
Prior to and after his appointment as the NSC Deputy Minister, Sun was a researcher at the Institute of Molecular Biology of the Academia Sinica, Taiwan's national research institute.

References

Ministers of Science and Technology of the Republic of China
Living people
Year of birth missing (living people)
National Taiwan University alumni